The bluebirds are a North American group of medium-sized, mostly insectivorous or omnivorous birds in the order of Passerines in the genus Sialia of the thrush family (Turdidae). Bluebirds are one of the few thrush genera in the Americas.

Bluebirds have blue, or blue and rose beige, plumage. Female birds are less brightly colored than males, although color patterns are similar and there is no noticeable difference in size.

Taxonomy and species 

The genus Sialia was introduced by the English naturalist William John Swainson in 1827 with the eastern bluebird (Sialia sialis) as the type species. A molecular phylogenetic study using mitochondrial sequences published in 2005 found that 
Sialia, Myadestes (solitaires) and Neocossyphus (African ant-thrushes) formed a basal clade in the family Turdidae. Within Sialia the mountain bluebird was sister to the eastern bluebird.

The genus contains three species:

Behavior

Bluebirds are territorial and prefer open grassland with scattered trees. This is similar to the behavior of many species of woodpeckers. Bluebirds can typically produce between two and four broods during the spring and summer (March through August in the Northeastern United States). Males identify potential nest sites and try to attract prospective female mates to those nesting sites with special behaviors that include singing and flapping wings, and then placing some material in a nesting box or cavity. If the female accepts the male and the nesting site, she alone builds the nest and incubates the eggs.

Predators of young bluebirds in the nests can include snakes, cats, and raccoons. Bird species competing with bluebirds for nesting locations include the common starling, American crow, and house sparrow, which take over the nesting sites of bluebirds, killing young, smashing eggs, and probably killing adult bluebirds.

Bluebirds are attracted to platform bird feeders, filled with grubs of the darkling beetle, sold by many online bird product wholesalers as mealworms. Bluebirds will also eat raisins soaked in water. In addition, in winter bluebirds use backyard heated birdbaths.

By the 1970s, bluebird numbers had declined by estimates ranging to 70% due to unsuccessful competition with house sparrows and starlings, both introduced species, for nesting cavities, coupled with a decline in habitat. In late 2005, Cornell University's Laboratory of Ornithology reported bluebird sightings across the southern U.S. as part of its yearly Backyard Bird Count, a strong indication of the bluebird's return to the region. This upsurge can be attributed largely to a movement of volunteers establishing and maintaining bluebird trails.

In the garden 
Bluebirds' consumption of insects make them popular with gardeners.

In culture

Iroquois
In traditional Iroquois cosmology, the call of the bluebird is believed to ward off the icy power of Sawiskera, also referred to as Flint, the spirit of the winter. Its call caused Sawiskera to flee in fear and the ice to recede.

As a symbol in songs 
"Bluebird of Happiness" is a song composed in 1934 by Sandor Harmati, with words by Edward Heyman and additional lyrics by Harry Parr-Davies.

"(There'll Be Bluebirds Over) The White Cliffs of Dover" was composed in 1941 by Walter Kent to lyrics by Nat Burton looking forward to a time when World War II would be over. Burton was unaware that the bluebird was not indigenous to England. Vera Lynn popularised the song with her performances to the troops.

"Bluebird" is a song written by Stephen Stills and recorded by the rock band Buffalo Springfield in 1967. It contains the lyrics "There she sits aloft at perch. Strangest color blue."

Songwriters have portrayed the bluebird as a muse, as in the song "Voices in the Sky" by the British rock group The Moody Blues, from their 1968 album In Search of the Lost Chord.

"Birdhouse in Your Soul", the 1989 ode to a nightlight by the band They Might Be Giants, references a “bluebird of friendliness” and a “blue canary” in its lyrics.

The titular bluebird of the song "Birds", from the 2013 album Government Plates by the Sacramento-based experimental hip hop group Death Grips, is thought to be referencing Charles Bukowski's poem "Bluebird", wherein bluebirds represent vulnerability that Bukowski felt as a result of child abuse from his father.

"Bluebird" is the title of Miranda Lambert's Country chart-topping late 2019 single from her album Wildcard . The song was co-written by Lambert who has said the song was a reference to the hope and optimism associated with bluebirds. The accompanying video for the song features a mountain bluebird.

See also
 Bluebird of happiness

References

External links 

Eastern Bluebird at All About Birds, The Cornell Lab—descriptions, including range, calls and physical description
Thrush videos on the Internet Bird Collection
North American Bluebird Society 
 Sialis—Information on bluebirds and their conservation and restoration.

 
Birds of North America
Taxa named by William John Swainson